Tre colonne in cronaca (Three columns in the news) is a 1990 Italian drama film directed by Carlo Vanzina. It is loosely based on the novel with the same name written by Corrado Augias and Daniela Pasti.

For his performance Sergio Castellitto won the David di Donatello award for best supporting actor.

Cast 

Gian Maria Volonté: Landolfi
Massimo Dapporto: Commissioner Dante Morisi   
Sergio Castellitto: Quinto 
Demetra Hampton: Kim   
Paolo Malco: Bruno Lachioma   
Lucrezia Lante Della Rovere: Monica Guarini
Spiros Focás: Bassouri 
Angelica Ippolito:  Giuditta Guarini 
Gianni Bonagura: Petroni 
Sandro Ghiani: Urru  
Carlo Giuffré: Spanò 
Joss Ackland: Gaetano Leporino 
Senta Berger: Countess  Odessa Bonaveri   
Pierfrancesco Aiello: Fabrizio  
Silverio Blasi: Castagna 
Pina Cei: Margherita  
Sandra Collodel: Irene
Clara Colosimo: Old lady with the cats 
Tony Sperandeo: Trapani 
Ivano Marescotti: Judge Manicardi  
Maurizio Mattioli: Car park attendant
Piero Gerlini: Santarelli
Piero Gerlini: Leporino's ex-wife

References

External links

1990 films
Italian drama films
Films directed by Carlo Vanzina
Films scored by Ennio Morricone
1990 drama films
Films about journalism
1990s Italian-language films
1990s Italian films